United States v. National Treasury Employees Union, 513 U.S. 454 (1995), was a United States Supreme Court case in which the Court held that Section 501(b) of the Ethics in Government Act of 1978 violates the First Amendment of the United States Constitution.

Background 
Congress amended the Ethics in Government Act of 1978 with the Ethics Reform Act of 1989. In section 501(b), Congress prohibited its members, federal officers, and other government employees from "accepting an honorarium for making an appearance, speech, or writing an article."

The National Treasury Employees Union challenged this section as an unconstitutional violation of the First Amendment's freedom of speech protection. The District Court held the honorarium ban unconstitutional and enjoined the government from enforcing it. The United States Court of Appeals for the District of Columbia Circuit affirmed the District Court's holding.

Opinion of the Court 
Associate Justice John Paul Stevens authored the majority opinion. Citing the test put forward in Pickering v. Board of Education of Township High School District 205, the Court found that the restriction put in place in Section 501(b) of the Act "constitutes a wholesale deterrent to a broad category of expression by a massive number of potential speakers" requiring an even greater burden than that put forward in Pickering.

References

External links

United States Supreme Court cases
United States Supreme Court cases of the Rehnquist Court
1995 in United States case law